The New Picture House (often called the NPH) is an independent cinema in St Andrews, Scotland from 1930. It contains three cinema screens. The largest screen has seats with electronic black recliners and ground level and balcony seating. A cinema lounge is available for hire for private parties of up to 22 people to view DVDs.

All cinema screens are equipped with traditional film projectors, digital projectors and digital 3D projectors.

External links
 https://twitter.com/NPHCinema/Official website/

References

Cinemas in Scotland